Telngoh is a sub-clan of Haokip, which is the prominent clan among the Thadou of Northeast India and Myanmar.

Prominent Among Telngoh 
 Yamthong Haokip, present Member of Legislative Assembly of Manipur from Saikul Assembly Constituency.
 Lunkhothang Haokip, an Indian Administrative Service (IAS).

References 

Ethnic groups in Manipur
Ethnic groups in Northeast India
Kuki tribes
Ethnic groups in South Asia